Westwood Community School District can refer to:
 Westwood Community School District (Iowa)
 Westwood Community School District (Michigan)